Carex wootonii, or Wooton's sedge, is a species of sedge that was first described by Kenneth Mackenzie in 1915.

References

wootonii
Plants described in 1915